All Saints' Church, Bakewell, is the parish church of Bakewell, Derbyshire, England. It is a Grade I listed building.

The first church

The church was founded in 920, during Anglo-Saxon times and the churchyard has two 9th-century crosses. During restoration work, in the 1840s, many carved fragments of Anglo-Saxon stonework were found in and around the porch, as well as some ancient stone coffins.

The present church
The present church was started in the 12th century in Norman style; however, only the west front and part of the nave survive from that time. The remainder of the church was built between 1220 and 1240. The spire was added in 1340 but, was taken down in 1825, and the tower also removed in 1830. Before the restoration work the church measurements were from the level of the church floor to the top of the spire , from east to west , transepts from north to south .

Between 1841 and 1844, it was almost completely rebuilt as it had become dangerous. as part of the restoration by William Flockton. 
Once the external works were completed in 1844, internal restorations were undertaken. The church was re-pewed throughout. The Norman piers from the nave were substituted for early English decorated ones, and steam heating was introduced. This work was carried out by Mr Bath of Haddon under the supervision of the architects John Grey Weightman and Matthew Ellison Hadfield of Sheffield. The church re-opened on 4 September 1851.

The chancel was restored between 1879 and 1882 by George Gilbert Scott Jr. The restoration was carried out at the expense of the Ven. Archdeacon Balston, vicar, with the outside walls being paid for by the Ecclesiastical commissioners. A new screen was provided under the chancel arch, with carving mimicking that on the screen in the Vernon Chapel. A new pavement of marble was laid. In the sanctuary, a new reredos was installed, with an engraving of the scene on Mount Calvary. The woodwork was done by Mr Elwell of Beverley. The walls by Burlison and Grylls, the floor by Belham of Buckingham Palace Road, London and the marble work by Twigg of Ashford.

A north vestry was added in 1897–98 at a cost of £700. The architects were Naylor and Sale of Derby, and the contractor T. Allsop and Son of Bakewell. The vestry was fitted out with furniture from Booth and Wright of Bakewell, and the woodwork was installed by Groom and Co of Bakewell and Matlock. It was dedicated by the Bishop of Southwell on 15 May 1898.

In 1906 – 07 the nave roof was repaired by Charles Hodgson Fowler. He fixed a large crane on an elevated timber platform just over the roof of the south porch, and covered the nave with a temporary iron roof. The crane was used to remove the old roof timbers. Oak trees from Holton Park, Oxfordshire were selected for the new roof timbers. Hodgson Fowler also replaced the tie beams and the wall plates. The cost of restoration was £445.

Misericords

All Saints' contains three early-15th-century misericords, along with eighteen 19th-century misericords in the choir stalls. Additionally, there is one 19th-century misericord on a priest's seat. The 19th-century misericords date from 1881.

Relics and monuments

The church has some interesting relics of the Vernon and Manners families as well as a fine 14th-century baptismal font. In the Vernon Chapel (off the South aisle) there are several magnificent tombs: Sir Thomas Wendesley (killed at the Battle of Shrewsbury in 1403; John Vernon of Haddon Hall, who died in 1477; and Sir George Vernon and his two wives.

Sir George, nicknamed 'King of the Peak', died in 1567, is famous as the father of Dorothy Vernon, who eloped with Sir John Manners, both of whom have a monument at the South end of the chapel. There is also a monument to their son, George Manners and his wife Grace.

Outside the chapel is a much smaller 14th-century alabaster monument to Sir Godfrey de Foljambe (died  1376) and his wife Avena (died 1382).
The monument is said to be very rare, with only two of that age surviving to the present day. It shows Foljambe and his wife as if they are looking out of a window and this can still be seen on the south wall. Below the mural is an explanatory inscription, but this dates from only 1803 and was "added by Mr Blore".

Stained glass
North aisle window of 1893 by Henry Holiday depicting Saints and Angels adoring the Lamb of God
North aisle window by Charles Eamer Kempe depicting St George and St Hubert
Chancel east window of 1892
North transept window of 1881 by Hardman & Co.
Resurrection window in Vernon Chapel, 1859 also by Hardman & Co.
South transept south window, 1851 by William Wailes.

Vicars of Bakewell
The majority of this list is taken from an article in the Sheffield Independent on 30 July 1901.

Organ

The organ dates from 1810 when a "finger organ" by J Lincoln was installed. This was rebuilt in 1851 by William Hill, but this appears to have been unsatisfactory as it was rebuilt again in 1859 and again in 1883 by Brindley & Foster. Further work by Jardine and Co in 1954 and George Sixsmith in 1989 have left the church with a 3 manual 42 speaking stop pipe organ. A specification of the organ can be found on the British Institute of Organ Studies National Pipe Organ Register at N00212.

Organists
John Fritche 1846–1860
Mr. Craddock of Truro 1860–1864
Mr. Hopper 1864–1868
W.H. Marsden 1868–1869
Frederick Burgess 1869–1873
C.C. Mitchell 1873–1877
Thomas Barker Mellor 1877–1913
G.C.E. Eyres 1913–???? (formerly organist of Walsall Parish Church)
W.E. Cave 1913–1932 (afterwards organist of Whitby Parish Church)
T.H. Mosley 1932–???? (previously organist of St Peter's Church, Edensor, Derbyshire)
Glyn Davies 1982–2016
Neil Clarke 2016-2018
Christopher Matthew Dell 2019-

The church today
Today, along with its regular religious services, the church is an important building in the town and the wider Peak District. It is used for, amongst other things, concerts by Bakewell Choral Society and the annual Commemoration service of Lady Manners School when they staff and pupils give thanks to Grace, Lady Manners, for founding their school in 1636.

The church website has much more information about the ongoing life and worship of the parish, including forthcoming services and other events.

Parish status
The church is in a joint parish with:
Holy Trinity Church, Ashford-in-the-Water
St Anne's Church, Over Haddon
St Katherine's Church, Rowsley
St Michael and All Angels' Church, Sheldon

See also
Grade I listed churches in Derbyshire
Listed buildings in Bakewell

Gallery

References

External links
Church website
Photographs of Bakewell Parish Church
More photographs of Bakewell Parish Church

Religious buildings and structures completed in 920
Church of England church buildings in Derbyshire
Grade I listed churches in Derbyshire
12th-century establishments in England
All Saints
10th-century church buildings in England